A superbloom is a rare desert botanical phenomenon.

Superbloom may also refer to:

Music
 Superbloom (album), 2020 album by MisterWives
 Superbloom, 2020 album by Ashton Irwin
 Superbloom, 2019 album by Ra Ra Riot
 "Superbloom", 2020 song by Ralph

Other uses
 San Diego Super Bloom, professional Ultimate sports team